Quidhampton is a hamlet within Overton civil parish in the borough of Basingstoke and Deane in Hampshire, England. It is located just to the north of the large village of Overton, on the north bank of the River Test. Overton railway station, on the West of England Main Line, is located in the hamlet.

Villages in Hampshire